"Didn't I" is a song by American band OneRepublic, released as the third single from their fifth studio album Human through Interscope Records on March 13, 2020. It was co-written by frontman Ryan Tedder with bassist Brent Kutzle, Zach Skelton, James Abrahart and Kyrre "Kygo" Gørvell-Dahll.

Background and composition
Talking about the song on New Music Daily with Zane Lowe on Apple Music, Tedder said, "So 'Didn't I' came from a place of somebody very dear to me… A couple that got divorced and I'm surrounded… My parents, got divorced, my wife's parents got divorced. Everybody, you know? We have friends that are going through it right now and I had this idea that when you marry somebody or you choose to be with them, it’s because you've had a lot of beautiful moments and somewhere the discord gets in. But then once you have the distance, and it does break up, and you do go through that divorce, you still have those moments. You look back and you go, you know what? This ended in a disaster, but weren't we amazing, when we were amazing? Wasn’t it good? It wasn’t all bad. There was a moment, didn't I love you? Didn't we fly? Wasn't this everything we thought it was, until it wasn't? And so that's really what the song's about."

In terms of musical notation, "Didn't I" is written in the key of E major and has a tempo of 124 beats per minute. Steered by piano and violin, the song follow a chord progression of C♯m – E – B – A in its verses, pre-chorus, and chorus and a chord progression of F♯m – A – C♯m – B in its bridge.

Music video
A music video to accompany the release of "Didn't I" was first released onto YouTube on March 13, 2020.

Personnel
Credits adapted from Tidal.
 Brent Kutzle – producer, composer, lyricist
 John Nathaniel – producer, co-producer, mixer, studio personnel
 Ryan Tedder – producer, composer, lyricist
 James Abrahart – composer, lyricist
 Kyrre Gørvell-Dahll – composer, lyricist
 Zach Skelton – composer, lyricist

Charts

Weekly charts

Year-end charts

Release history

References

2020 singles
2020 songs
OneRepublic songs
Song recordings produced by Kygo
Song recordings produced by Ryan Tedder
Songs written by Brent Kutzle
Songs written by James Abrahart 
Songs written by Kygo
Songs written by Ryan Tedder
Songs written by Zach Skelton